The Hungry Ghosts is a 2009 American  dramatic film written and directed by Michael Imperioli. The film marked his directorial feature debut.

Plot
Matthew (Emory Cohen) is a teenage boy in New York who attends  therapy with his father Frank (Steve Schirripa) because of their troubled communication. During a session, Matthew runs away. Angela (Sharon Angela), his mother, is worried. Frank, however, is more concerned with his radio show, and whether his techs got his vodka. He proceeds to use cocaine as well before the show begins. Matthew goes to a park where a lot of homeless people are congregated. He meets a couple who give him alcohol and drugs. Later, the woman has sex with Matthew while the man watches.

Nadia (Aunjanue Ellis) abandons her room because she is a month late with  her rent. She reconnects with an old friend from a yoga school, has sex with an old boyfriend, then leaves her yoga center friend's house when her friend becomes upset by her story of her relationship with Gus (Nick Sandow), her most recent lover. She has a meal on the stairs of a house. The woman living there comes home and tells her to leave, but Nadia refuses. The woman throws a bucket of water over her, and Nadia puts the bucket on the woman's head and beats on it.

Gus is just getting out of a ninety-day drug rehabilitation stint. He immediately goes out and gets drunk with an old man he meets in a restaurant. He calls Nadia again and again, but she will not answer his calls. He meets a woman, Lisette (Bess Rous), who has been in the same meditation class which he and Nadia attended. He succeeds in unnerving, and then seducing her, but instead of following through on that, he tells her to go home.

Matthew calls his father, who refuses to pick him up because he is in the middle of his show. Instead, Matthew's uncle, Joey (Joe Caniano), picks him up. Once home, Matthew will not say what happened, even though Angela assures she will not be angry. He tries to kill himself, but Angela and Joey head up to the mountains with him to help him work out his distress.

Once Frank learns what has happened, he heads to the mountains on a train, where he meets Nadia, who is fleeing the city. He begins to suffer chest pains, and Nadia calls for help. He is taken to a hospital. She is waiting for him when he comes out of the emergency room, and during a meal together, she encourages him to come to a meditation class with her. Lissette is in the class, but she and Nadia do not know each other. Frank begins to relax as the teacher leads them through guided breathing exercises. Gus, having  taken an overdose of pills, arrives, causing distress to Nadia and Lisette by his presence. He sits next to Nadia, who obviously does not want him there, but with a blissful smile, he lies down on the floor and closes his eyes.

Cast
Steve Schirripa as Frank
Sharon Angela as Angela
Emory Cohen as Matthew
Aunjanue Ellis as Nadia
Vincent Curatola as Nicky Z
John Ventimiglia as James
Nick Sandow as Gus
Ajay Naidu as Laurence
Jim Hendricks as Ansel
Sondra James as Lucy
Jerry Grayson as Jerry
Bess Rous as Lisette
Zohra Lampert as Ruth

Production notes
In an interview with MovieMaker Magazine, Imperioli said he used techniques from John Cassavetes, his favorite filmmaker, in creating The Hungry Ghosts.

Although Imperioli did not appear in the film, he recruited four castmates that he had previously worked together on, from the HBO television series, The Sopranos. The castmates were Schirripa, Angela, Ventimiglia and Curatola.

The film was executive produced by Joseph Scarpinito and Joseph Laurita.

Awards and nominations
International Film Festival Rotterdam
Nominated, "Tiger Award"

References

External links

2009 films
2009 drama films
American drama films
Films shot in New York City
2009 directorial debut films
2000s English-language films
2000s American films